Vaccinium corymbosum, the northern highbush blueberry, is a North American species of blueberry which has become a food crop of significant economic importance. It is native to eastern Canada and the eastern and southern United States, from Ontario east to Nova Scotia and south as far as Florida and eastern Texas. It is also naturalized in other places: Europe, Japan, New Zealand, the Pacific Northwest of North America, etc. Other common names include blue huckleberry, tall huckleberry, swamp huckleberry, high blueberry, and swamp blueberry.

Description
It is often found in dense thickets. In autumn, the leaves turn to a brilliant red, orange, yellow, and/or purple.

The fruit is a  diameter blue-black berry. This plant is found in wooded or open areas with moist acidic soils.

The species is tetraploid and does not self-pollinate. Most cultivars have a chilling requirement greater than 800 hours.

History

Many wild species of Vaccinium are thought to have been cultivated by Native Americans for thousands of years, with intentional crop burnings in northeastern areas being apparent from archeological evidence. V. corymbosum, being one of the species likely used by these peoples, was later studied and domesticated in 1908 by Elizabeth Coleman White and Frederick Vernon Coville.

Uses
In natural habitats, the berries are a food source for native and migrating birds, bears, and small mammals. The foliage is browsed by deer and rabbits.

The berries were collected and used in Native American cuisine in areas where Vaccinium corymbosum grew as a native plant.

Cultivation
Vaccinium corymbosum is the most common commercially grown blueberry in present-day North America.

It is also cultivated as an ornamental plant for home and wildlife gardens and natural landscaping projects. The pH must be very acidic (4.5 to 5.5).

Cultivars
Some common cultivar varieties are listed here, grouped by approximate start of the harvest season:

The cultivars Duke and Spartan have gained the Royal Horticultural Society's Award of Garden Merit.

Southern highbush blueberry
Some named Southern highbush blueberry are hybridized forms derived from crosses between V. corymbosum and  Vaccinium darrowii, a native of the Southeastern U.S. These hybrids and other cultivars of V. darrowii (Southern highbush blueberry) have been developed for cultivation in warm southern and western regions of North America.

Gallery

See also
 Vaccinium
 Huckleberry

References

External links
United States Department of Agriculture Plants Profile for Vaccinium corymbosum (highbush blueberry)
Species account and photographs from Lady Bird Johnson Wildflower Center Native Plant Information Network (NPIN)

corymbosum
Blueberries
Fruits originating in North America
Crops originating from North America
Flora of Eastern Canada
Flora of the Eastern United States
Flora of the Appalachian Mountains
Plants described in 1753
Taxa named by Carl Linnaeus
Bird food plants
Plants used in Native American cuisine
Garden plants of North America